The 2018–19 Women's National Cricket League season was the 23rd season of the Women's National Cricket League, the women's domestic limited overs cricket competition in Australia. The tournament started on 21 September 2018 and finished on 9 February 2019. Defending champions New South Wales Breakers won the tournament for the 20th time after topping the ladder and beating Queensland Fire in the final.

Ladder

Fixtures

Round 1

Round 2

Round 3

Final

Statistics

Highest totals

Most runs

Most wickets

References

Notes

Bibliography

External links

 WNCL 2018–19 on cricket.com.au
 Series home at ESPNcricinfo

 
Women's National Cricket League seasons
 
Women's National Cricket League